The Socialist History Society (SHS) is a British-based organisation which publishes a twice-yearly journal (Socialist History) mainly about the history of the socialist and labour movements in Britain. It also publishes a series of pamphlets on single themes once or twice a year, and a members' newsletter. It holds lectures, film screenings and similar events in London, on its own and jointly with other groups, and organises occasional conferences. 

It was founded in 1992 as the successor to the Communist Party Historians Group, but the SHS is not now linked to any political party or ideological tendency instead making full membership available to anybody regardless of party affiliation. The SHS now publishes a twice-yearly journal Socialist History and a series of monographs called "Occasional Papers".

External links
Official site
Socialist History Journal homepage

1992 establishments in the United Kingdom
History of socialism
History organisations based in the United Kingdom
Organizations established in 1992
Communist Party Historians Group